Jeong Da-rae (born December 2, 1991) is a South Korean former swimmer, who specialized in breaststroke events. She is a gold medalist in the 200 m breaststroke at the 2010 Asian Games in Guangzhou, China.

Jeong made her official debut, as a 16-year-old, at the 2008 Summer Olympics in Beijing, where she qualified for the women's 200 m breaststroke. She cleared a FINA B-cut of 2:27.78 from the Good Luck Beijing China Open. On the evening preliminaries, Jeong rounded out the semifinal field by taking the final spot in a lifetime best of 2:27.28, just half a second (0.50) faster than her entry time. The next morning's session, Jeong failed to qualify for the final, as she placed fourteenth overall in the semifinal run at 2:28.28.

At the 2009 FINA World Championships in Rome, Italy, Jeong matched her preliminary heat time of 2:25.00 in the semifinals, but finished only in twelfth place. Six months later, she edged out her teammate Jung Seul-ki to take a silver medal by a two-tenth margin (0.20) in the same discipline at the East Asian Games in Hong Kong, China, breaking her personal best of 2:24.90.

At the 2010 Asian Games in Guangzhou, Jeong picked up the women's 200 m breaststroke title in 2:25.02, beating two Chinese swimmers for the silver and bronze medals. Jeong's best effort at the Asian Games moved her up to fifteenth in the world rankings.

Four years after competing in her first Olympics, Jeong qualified for her second South Korean team, as a 20-year-old, at the 2012 Summer Olympics in London. She attained a FINA A-standard entry time of 2:26.07 from the Dong-A Swimming Tournament in Ulsan. Jeong shared a fourteenth-fastest qualifying time of 2:26.83 with Russia's Yuliya Efimova in the morning's preliminary heats to secure a spot for the semifinals. On the evening session, Jeong failed to qualify for the final, as she finished her semifinal run with a slowest time of 2:28.74.

personal life 
On August 10, 2022, Jeong posted a wedding dress on Instagram that she is getting married to her non-celebrity boyfriend in September 2022.

References

External links
NBC Olympics Profile

 

1991 births
Living people
South Korean female breaststroke swimmers
Olympic swimmers of South Korea
Swimmers at the 2008 Summer Olympics
Swimmers at the 2012 Summer Olympics
Asian Games medalists in swimming
Swimmers at the 2010 Asian Games
Sportspeople from South Jeolla Province
Asian Games gold medalists for South Korea
Medalists at the 2010 Asian Games
21st-century South Korean women